Wayne Hodgson (25 June 1959 – 20 August 2013) was a New Zealand cricketer. He played thirteen first-class and eleven List A matches for Central Districts between 1979 and 1982.

References

External links
 

1959 births
2013 deaths
New Zealand cricketers
Central Districts cricketers
Cricketers from Nelson, New Zealand
South Island cricketers